Sunday Calm is a 1923 short silent comedy film directed by Robert F. McGowan. It was the 20th Our Gang short subject released.

Plot
The gang travels by wagon to go on a picnic with their families. After the cart loses a wheel, the parents replace it, only to be left behind when the horse bolts with the wagon and the gang. Arriving in the woods, the gang run wild until their parents catch up with them. A storm interrupts the picnic, after which the horse bolts again, this time leaving everybody behind.

Production notes
Mary Kornman does not appear.

The plot device of a family embarking on a Sunday picnic was reused in Laurel and Hardy's 1929 film Perfect Day.

Cast

The Gang
 Joe Cobb — Joe Tucker
 Jackie Condon — Jackie Tucker
 Mickey Daniels — Mickey McTeeter
 Jack Davis — Jack Tucker
 Allen Hoskins — Farina
 Ernest Morrison — Ernie
 Leona Levin — Mickey's sister

Additional cast
 Richard Daniels — Mr. Tucker
 Clara Guiol — Mrs. Tucker
 Helen Gilmore — Mrs. McTeeter

References

External links

1923 films
1923 comedy films
American silent short films
American black-and-white films
Films directed by Robert F. McGowan
Hal Roach Studios short films
Our Gang films
1923 short films
1920s American films
Silent American comedy films